The 2021 Macha Lake Open was a professional women's tennis tournament played on outdoor clay courts. It was the nineteenth edition of the tournament which was part of the 2021 ITF Women's World Tennis Tour. It took place in Staré Splavy, Czech Republic between 14 and 20 June 2021.

Singles main-draw entrants

Seeds

 1 Rankings are as of 31 May 2021.

Other entrants
The following players received wildcards into the singles main draw:
  Nikola Bartůňková
  Sára Bejlek
  Linda Nosková
  Darja Viďmanová

The following player received entry using a protected ranking:
  Destanee Aiava
  Alexandra Dulgheru

The following players received entry from the qualifying draw:
  Irene Burillo Escorihuela
  Miriam Kolodziejová
  Johana Marková
  İpek Öz
  Andreea Prisăcariu
  Dominika Šalková
  Tereza Smitková
  Kimberley Zimmermann

Champions

Singles

 Zheng Qinwen def.  Aleksandra Krunić, 7–6(7–5), 6–3

Doubles

  Valentini Grammatikopoulou /  Richèl Hogenkamp def.  Amina Anshba /  Anastasia Dețiuc, 6–3, 6–4

References

External links
 2021 Macha Lake Open at ITFtennis.com
 Official website

2021 ITF Women's World Tennis Tour
2021 in Czech tennis
June 2021 sports events in the Czech Republic